Paraphronima is a genus of crustaceans belonging to the monotypic family Paraphronimidae.

The genus has almost cosmopolitan distribution.

Species:

Paraphronima crassipes 
Paraphronima gracilis

References

Amphipoda